Unto Olavi Valpas (October 4, 1944 – September 13, 2016) was a Finnish politician and member of Finnish Parliament, representing the Left Alliance. He was elected to the Finnish Parliament in 1999.

References

1944 births
2016 deaths
People from Kokkola
Left Alliance (Finland) politicians
Members of the Parliament of Finland (1999–2003)
Members of the Parliament of Finland (2003–07)
Members of the Parliament of Finland (2007–11)